Climactichnites is an enigmatic, Cambrian fossil formed on or within sandy tidal flats around .
It has been interpreted in many different ways in the past, but is now thought to be a trace fossil of a slug-like organism that moved by crawling to on-shore surfaces, or near-shore, or burrowing into the sediment.

Morphology
There are two species within this ichnogenus, C. wilsoni and C. youngi.  C. wilsoni consists of paired lateral ridges between which are undulating bars and furrows oriented at an angle to the direction of travel, whereas C. youngi lacks the paired lateral ridges and consists only of undulating transverse bars and furrows. An additional trace fossil, called Musculopodus, is sometimes found at the beginning of Climactichnites trails and represents the body imprint of the animal while it was stationary. Climactichnites range from 0.8 to 30 cm wide and may exceed ten feet long, making Climactichnites by far the largest Cambrian trace fossil. Based on measured ratios of Musculopodus imprints, the animal itself is estimated to have reached 69 cm long.

Occurrence
Currently, Climactichnites is known only from North America (Missouri, New York, Wisconsin, and Texas in the United States, and Quebec and Ontario in Canada), portions of which were submerged under a shallow equatorial sea during the Cambrian Period.  The fossil is found in fine- to coarse-grained sandstones and orthoquartzites which represent sandy, intertidal beach deposits.    Microbial mats probably enabled the trace to be preserved.

Interpretation
Early attempts to interpret the fossil as the body of an alga or siphonophore are easily falsified. Climactichnites is now thought to represent the trail or burrow of an organism moving, respectively, on top of or through the sediment. The animal apparently had a muscular foot and moved by extending either side of its body alternately (sometimes both sides may have been extended in unison) to produce the v-shaped transverse bars. Certainly the animal lacked any appendages, as is evidenced by cross-cutting relationships of the trail with sedimentary structures such as ripple marks.    While the identity of the trace-maker remains  conjectural, Climactichnites was most likely produced by a large slug-like mollusc; modern gastropods have been observed to produce similar traces.  Since it is often associated with surface-produced sedimentary structures, it may have been produced by one of the earliest animals to move about on land.  The binding effect of microbial mats on the sediment surface is believed to have contributed to the exceptional preservation of Climactichnites trails.

References

Getty, P. R., and J. W. Hagadorn, 2006. Producing and preserving Climactichnites. Geological Society of America Abstracts with Programs, v. 38, p. 475.

External links

Includes additional photographs and information on Climactichnites from the exceptional Blackberry Hill localities.
Blackberry hill fossils
Discusses a major source of Climactichnites trails.  With useful photograph slideshow.

Trace fossils
Fossil trackways
Cambrian life
Incertae sedis